Edward John Richard Thomas (14 October 1883 – 7 July 1916) was a Welsh international rugby union back who played club rugby for Mountain Ash.

Early life
He was educated at Ferndale Board School, Glamorganshire. He joined the Glamorganshire Constabulary in November 1904, and was posted to Mountain Ash, remaining there until the start of the First World War.

Rugby career
Thomas first played rugby for local Rhondda clubs, Ferndale and Penygraig before moving to Mountain Ash, the team he would captain during the 1904/05 season. He faced his first international opposition when he was chosen to represent Glamorgan, an invitational county team that faced the touring South Africans in 1906. Glamorgan played well but lost 6-3 though if Bert Winfield had completed his kicks the Welsh would have won. Thomas would gain his first cap later that year, when a Welsh team was formed to face the same South African team. Thomas, along with the other newly capped players, John Dyke and John Jenkins were judged not to show great ability, but were far superior to the other non-capped players available. Wales lost the game, which saw the end of many great Welsh players.

From 1906 to 1907, Thomas was incapacitated due to appendicitis, but he returned to first-class rugby after his appendix was removed.

Unlike Dyke and Jenkins, Thomas was reselected for his country again, but he needed to wait until the 1908 Home Nations Championship, when he was chosen to face France at the Cardiff Arms Park. Under the captaincy of Teddy Morgan Wales were victorious, as they were two weeks later when Thomas won his third cap against Ireland in Belfast. Thomas's last game was the following year in a match against Scotland. Billy Trew not only led the team but scored the winning try which Jack Bancroft converted.

International appearances

Military service
At the start of the First World War, Thomas was in the Welsh constabulary, and was unable to stand down from his police duties and until 16 January 1915, when he enlisted in the 16th Battalion Welsh Regiment. He was in training with his regiment at Colwyn Bay until August, being rapidly promoted, in the meantime, to Company Sergeant Major by March. The Welsh Division was deployed to the Western Front in December 1915. He was killed in action, shot through the head, in the taking of Mametz Wood on 7 July 1916.

He is commemorated at the Thiepval Memorial to the Missing of the Somme. Another Welsh international died in the same military action, wing player Johnnie Williams.

See also
 List of international rugby union players killed in action during the First World War

References

Bibliography

External links

1883 births
1916 deaths
Bridgend RFC players
Glamorgan Police officers
British Army personnel of World War I
British military personnel killed in the Battle of the Somme
Ferndale RFC players
Glamorgan County RFC players
Glamorgan Police RFC players
Monmouthshire County RFC players
Mountain Ash RFC players
Penygraig RFC players
Royal Welch Fusiliers officers
Wales international rugby union players
Welsh police officers
Welsh rugby union players
Welsh military personnel